Saint-Jean-de-Thurac (Languedocien: Sent Joan de Turac) is a commune in the Lot-et-Garonne department in south-western France. It lies to the east of the town of Agen. The departmental road D813 which leads eastward from Agen to Toulouse passes through the commune. There are no commercial premises in this commune and the district derives its name from a thirteenth-century Catholic church which lies just off the D813. Beside the church is an elementary school and the Mairie, or town hall, building.

Demography

See also
Communes of the Lot-et-Garonne department

References

Saintjeandethurac